Themistoklis Tzimopoulos (born 20 November 1985) is a Greek-born New Zealand professional footballer who plays as a centre back for Super League club Levadiakos and the New Zealand national team.

Club career
Born in Kozani, Greece, Tzimopoulos began his professional career with Akratitos in December 2003, having previously signed as a trainee. He played for Akratitos in the Greek Super League, before joining Veria, as well as a brief loan spell at Kerkyra in 2008. He joined second division side Ethnikos Asteras for the 2009–10 season.

In September 2010, Tzimopoulos signed a two-year contract with PAS Giannina.

On 6 April 2017, Tzimopoulos had a surgery on the knee to restore meniscal tear suffered, and will naturally lose the remainder of the current season. On 2 May 2018 he extended his contract until the summer of 2020.

On 21 June 2019, Tzimopoulos was released from PAS Giannina.

Three days later, he signed a two-year contract with Korona Kielce on a free transfer.

International career
Tzimopoulos was called into the All Whites squad for a 31 March 2015 friendly in Seoul against South Korea by coach Anthony Hudson. Tzimopoulos is eligible for the All Whites through his mother's birthplace. "Every professional player dreams to play international football so it's an honour for me to play for the All Whites. It will be a great challenge for me to play at a higher level and to meet the requirements of the team.", he said.

On 28 May 2016, with an early goal from Tzimopoulos, the All Whites got off to a winning start at the OFC Nations Cup after a hard-fought and physical 3-1 victory over Fiji. Tzimopoulos exceptional season year with PAS Giannina was his passport to be called by Anthony Hudson to the final 23-man squad for 2017 Confederations Cup.

International goals
Scores and results list New Zealand's goal tally first.

Honours

Akratitos
Beta Ethniki runner-up: 2004–05

Levadiakos
Super League 2: 2021–22

New Zealand
OFC Nations Cup: 2016

References

External links

Profile at Onsports.gr

1985 births
Living people
Footballers from Kozani
New Zealand association footballers
New Zealand expatriate association footballers
Greek footballers
Greek expatriate footballers
Greek expatriate sportspeople in Poland
Super League Greece players
Football League (Greece) players
Delta Ethniki players
Ekstraklasa players
I liga players
A.P.O. Akratitos Ano Liosia players
Veria F.C. players
A.O. Kerkyra players
Ethnikos Asteras F.C. players
PAS Giannina F.C. players
Korona Kielce players
Levadiakos F.C. players
Association football central defenders
New Zealand people of Greek descent
2016 OFC Nations Cup players
2017 FIFA Confederations Cup players
New Zealand international footballers
Expatriate footballers in Greece
New Zealand expatriate sportspeople in Greece
Expatriate footballers in Poland
New Zealand expatriate sportspeople in Poland